is a Japanese former professional baseball pitcher. He played for the Hanshin Tigers in Japan's Nippon Professional Baseball from 2010 to 2013.

External links

NPB stats

1988 births
Living people
Baseball people from Gifu Prefecture
Ritsumeikan University alumni
Nippon Professional Baseball pitchers
Hanshin Tigers players
Japanese expatriate baseball players in Australia
Canberra Cavalry players